Užpaliai (traditional) is a town in Utena County, Lithuania. According to the 2011 census, the town has a population of 758 people.

History
The Jewish population was important in the town, for example, in 1897, 691 inhabitants were Jewish out of a total population of 740 people. 
In July 1941, the Jewish population was massacred in mass executions perpetrated by an Einsatzgruppen of Lithuanian nationalists on different sites.

Gallery

References

Towns in Lithuania
Towns in Utena County
Vilkomirsky Uyezd
Holocaust locations in Lithuania
Utena District Municipality